Danny Quinn (born Daniele Anthony Quinn; 16 April 1964) is an Italian-born American actor. He is the son of Anthony Quinn. Since 1986, he has appeared in more than twenty films, including his role as Carlos in the cult film Band of the Hand.

From 1991 to 1993, Quinn was married to the actress Lauren Holly.

On 21 October 2016, he married Nancy Maamary (Lebanese) in Verona, Italy, they have a daughter, Luna Quinn born on 14 March 2018. 
In all of the three movies he plays Jesus of Nazareth.

He received the America Award of the Italy-USA Foundation in 2019.

Selected filmography

References

External links 

1964 births
Living people
Italian male film actors
Italian people of Mexican descent
Italian people of Irish descent